Julian Gingell (born 29 December 1969), known as Jules, is a British songwriter and record producer, best known for his partnership with fellow writer and producer Barry Stone under the name Jewels and Stone.

Gingell moved to London to work with Stock Aitken Waterman, just as the record-producing trio began to establish their  reputation for releasing 1980s pop music, from artists such as Bananarama, Kylie Minogue, Jason Donovan and Rick Astley.

After the three founding members of Stock Aitken Waterman's partnership fell apart, Gingell spent some time working for Mike Stock and Matt Aitken, who had continued as a duo.

In 1999, he set up his own production business with long-time friend and co-producer Barry Stone, formerly frontman of late period Romo band Belvedere Kane, whose single "Never Felt As Good" was later covered by fellow Romo band Massive Ego on their belated 2006 debut album Nite Klub Skewl. They called the company Jewels and Stone (Jewels as in Jules, an abbreviation of Julian, and Stone from Barry Stone's surname).

As well as remixing songs such as Sophie Ellis-Bextor's "Murder on the Dancefloor", Boyzone's "No Matter What" and S Club 7's "Don't Stop Movin'", the duo are credited with writing and producing the Adam Rickitt hit "I Breathe Again", which reached number 5 in the UK Singles Chart in 1999, the S Club Juniors (later S Club 8) single "Automatic High", which reached number 2 in the same chart and Rachel Stevens' "I Said Never Again (But Here We Are)".

The pair also collaborated with Hear’Say and Five. Their most internationally recognised achievement was composing the theme music for the British TV talent show, Pop Idol with Cathy Dennis. The same music was used as the theme to its U.S. equivalent, American Idol, and other versions of the same show around the world. They were honoured at the 26th Annual Film & Television Music Awards by the American Society of Composers, Authors and Publishers for this music.

References

1969 births
Living people
British record producers
British songwriters